Mykolas Ruzgys (January 15, 1915 – December 15, 1986) was a Lithuanian-American basketball player. He won gold medal with Lithuania national basketball team during the EuroBasket 1939, held in Kaunas.

Biography
Born in the United States as Michael Paul Rutzgis, around 1938 he moved to Kaunas, Lithuania and became CJSO basketball team member and player. He was invited to Lithuania national basketball team and became champion of Europe in 1939. He was fifth in scoring during the competition. Around 1940 Ruzgys returned to the United States and was forced to leave his pregnant wife Danutė in Lithuania. He never saw her again due to the Soviet occupation of Lithuania and never met his daughter, who was born just a few weeks after he left.

After the World War II he settled in Monaco where he became a basketball coach. He coached the Spain national basketball team in the 1950 FIBA World Championship in Buenos Aires, Argentina, while at the same time coaching one team in the Spanish League, U.D. Huesca. After that, he became player-coach for Bazan Ferrol.

Player-coach at Bazán Ferrol 

Bazan also sponsored its own men's and women's basketball teams. The men's A Team was good enough to play in the Second Division, and some say that the shipyard refused a berth in the First for financial reasons. On Monday June 1, 1953, Bazan won the Regions Federation Cup in Valladolid by defeating Español de Valencia 43-30. The newspaper Mundo Deportivo praised the speed of the Bazan players and singled out Rusghise [sic] as their best player, who was also the coach and whose real name was Michael P. Rutzgis.

The 1954 season was arguably Team A's best. In February, Bazan played a home friendly against the Spanish national team; the game ended 69-57. Between May 11-13 Bazan played in the round-robin inter-regional championship held in Valladolid against Águilas de Valladolid, Real Valladolid and Covadonga de Gijón. On Tuesday May 11 Bazan beat Covadonga de Gijón 44-28 with "manifest superiority." On Wednesday Bazan defeated Águilas de Valladolid 59-43. The decisive game was played at noon on Thursday "under a blazing sun" against Real Valladolid. In a "colossal feat" Bazan won 54-39. The outstanding Bazan players of the series were Pardo, Lobón and Polo. The championship advanced the team to the Copa del Generalísimo in Madrid where they would face San Adrián de Barcelona, Estudiantes de Madrid and Real Madrid.

On Thursday May 20, 1954, Bazan left Ferrol for Madrid on the TAF. On Sunday at 7:00 PM Bazan beat San Adrián de Barcelona 64-46. On Monday at 11:00 PM Bazan defeated Estudiantes de Madrid 74-63. On Tuesday at 11:00 PM Bazan succumbed to Real Madrid 37-67. "The superiority of Real Madrid was evident, they were always ahead on the scoreboard." On Wednesday May 26 the team returned from Madrid. "Players of juvenile and junior basketball teams [and] many fans gave the Ferrol sportsmen an affectionate and cordial welcome home" at a transfer railway station forty-one kilometers away from the city.

A short note in the newspaper La Voz de Galicia of June 9, 1954, summed up the extraordinary season thus, "Our unreserved applause for Ruzgis [sic] and those sportsmen he so skilfully trains."...

Sources

 Vidas Mačiulis, Vytautas Gudelis. Halė, kurioje žaidė Lubinas ir Sabonis. 1939–1989. – Respublikinis sporto kombinatas, Kaunas, 1989.
 http://historiabasket.blogspot.com.es/2011/08/el-catalogo-del-buen-ferrolano.html
 http://hemeroteca-paginas.mundodeportivo.com/EMD02/HEM/1953/06/01/MD19530601-001.pdf

References

1915 births
1986 deaths
FIBA EuroBasket-winning players
Lithuanian men's basketball players